Peng Luyang (born 10 January 1985) is a Chinese table tennis player. Her highest career ITTF ranking was 25.

References

1985 births
Living people
Chinese female table tennis players